Wayne Burton is a Canadian para-alpine skier. He represented Canada at the 1984 Winter Paralympics in alpine skiing. He won the silver medal at the Men's Slalom LW1 event and the bronze medal at the Men's Downhill LW1 event. He also competed in the Men's Giant Slalom LW1 event but did not finish.

See also 
 List of Paralympic medalists in alpine skiing

References 

Living people
Year of birth missing (living people)
Place of birth missing (living people)
Paralympic alpine skiers of Canada
Alpine skiers at the 1984 Winter Paralympics
Medalists at the 1984 Winter Paralympics
Paralympic silver medalists for Canada
Paralympic bronze medalists for Canada
Paralympic medalists in alpine skiing